Whitworth University is a private, Christian university affiliated with the Presbyterian Church (USA) and located in Spokane, Washington. Founded in 1890, Whitworth enrolls nearly 3,000 students and offers more than 100 graduate and undergraduate programs.

Whitworth competes athletically at the NCAA Division III level in the Northwest Conference as the Pirates. Its colors are black and crimson.

History

In 1883, George F. Whitworth established the Sumner Academy in Sumner, a small town in Washington Territory, east of Tacoma. Incorporated as Whitworth College in 1890, it relocated to Tacoma in 1899. When a Spokane developer offered land just before World War I, the college moved once more, and classes were held for the first time in Spokane in September 1914. The college relocated due to persistent financial difficulties, local competition from College of Puget Sound and the Pacific Lutheran Academy, and a lack of support from the Washington state Presbyterian Synod or the City of Tacoma. The college's leadership led by President Donald D. MacKay came to realize that a relocation would likely be necessary to secure Whitworth's future. When Whitworth was approached by Spokane boosters, the Spokane Presbytery, and railroad magnate Jay P. Graves with some land on his new Country Homes development outside the city, the trustees agreed to the move provided that the Spokane community donate $70,000 and the Synod of Washington donate $30,000 for facilities. Whitworth merged with Spokane Junior College in 1942, when the latter shut down due to financial difficulties during World War II.

The board of trustees voted to change the institution's name to Whitworth University in 2006, which became effective July 1, 2007.

Campus 

Whitworth's campus in northern Spokane has  of stately pines and wide-open green spaces. In 2009, Whitworth opened a University District (U-District) location near downtown Spokane, expanding program offerings for nontraditional evening students and providing an ideal location with shorter commutes for working professionals.

Due to an expanding student body, the university has invested more than $170 million in campus improvements in recent years. In 2022, Whitworth completed construction on the new Dana & David Dornsife Health Sciences Building. Additionally, Whitworth completed construction of the Pines Café & Bookstore along Hawthorne Road and the $13 million Whitworth Athletics Leadership Team Center, also known as the WALT. The 28,000-square-foot facility houses all of the coaches and staff of the university's 22 athletic programs, who used to be spread out among six buildings, and includes coaches’ offices, a football locker room, conference rooms, public lounges and a 162-seat team room.

The university finished renovation on the Megan E. Thompson Aquatic Center in 2019 and completed a renovation of the Beeksma Family Theology Center in 2018, which expanded the Seely G. Mudd Chapel and provided offices for more than 20 faculty, staff and student employees. In 2015, the university renovated the Cowles Music Center, which remodeled the existing space and added  of new teaching studios, practice rooms, rehearsal rooms, and lobby space.

In 2011, the Robinson Science Hall was dedicated. This  building was built for biology and chemistry sciences, as well as math courses. The Robinson Science Hall is part of a three-phase expansion that includes renovations of the Eric Johnston Science Center, which is the current building for plant biology, physics, and other courses in the science, technology, engineering, and math degrees that Whitworth offers.

Since 2010, all new facilities constructed on the Whitworth campus are LEED-certified.

Academics 
Whitworth offers over 100 undergraduate majors and programs, six graduate programs, two doctoral programs and seven adult bachelor's degree completion programs. Academics at Whitworth is organized in four branches:

The College of Arts and Sciences supports Whitworth INQ, an innovative shared curriculum approach to general education and houses 18 undergraduate arts and science departments. The college offers 47 majors, the M.A in Theology and M.S. in Athletic Training graduate programs; Doctor of Occupational Therapy (OTD) and Doctor of Physical Therapy (DPT) programs; and a number of interdisciplinary undergraduate programs, including Biology, Theology, Chemistry, Communications, Health Sciences, and Computer Science.

The School of Business includes undergraduate programs in accounting, business management, economics, finance, and marketing. It also oversees two graduate programs, a Master of Business Administration (MBA) and Master of Business Leadership (MBL). The Whitworth School of Business became AACSB accredited in 2020.

The School of Education includes the Department of Undergraduate Teacher Education; the Department of Graduate Studies in Education; the Master in Teaching (MIT) Program; the Evening Teacher Certification Program; the Center for Gifted Education; and the Special Education Program.

The School of Continuing Studies provides bachelor's degree programs for non-traditional students through evening degree programs, accelerated-format classes and certificate programs.

The university also offers 30-plus study abroad programs available to students over Jan Term, May Term, or during a full semester. 45 percent of Whitworth's 2021 graduates participated in one or more off-campus programs.

Admissions
Whitworth's admission standards are considered "more selective" by U.S. News & World Report.

The Class of 2026 had a middle 50% SAT score range of 1080-1280 and an average GPA of 3.71.

Students on campus represent 33 states and 43 countries. As of 2022, international students make up 6 percent of undergraduate enrollment.

Rankings

In 2022, U.S. News & World Report ranked Whitworth #1 in Best Undergraduate Teaching (West), #1 in Best Value (West), #3 Best Regional University (West), and #2 Best Colleges for Veterans (West). The Princeton Review also named Whitworth "Best in the West" on the 2022 Best Colleges list.

In 2022, Whitworth was named to the Phi Theta Kappa Honor Society's Transfer Honor Roll for the third year in a row. 

INSIGHT into Diversity Magazine awarded Whitworth the 2020 Higher Education Excellence in Diversity (HEED) Award.

The Arbor Day Foundation has recognized Whitworth as a Tree Campus USA® since 2018.

Athletics
Whitworth's athletics teams are the Pirates. The university offers 21 varsity sports and competes in the Northwest Conference of the National Collegiate Athletic Association (NCAA) Division III. Men's sports include cross country, football, basketball, swimming, track and field (indoor and outdoor), golf, tennis, soccer and baseball; women compete in soccer, volleyball, basketball, swimming, track and field (indoor and outdoor), golf, tennis, lacrosse and softball. Whitworth has played their home football games at the Pine Bowl (an on-campus football stadium) since the 1930s. The field within the Pine Bowl was changed to turf from grass in 2017 and subsequently was dedicated to the parents of the main donors by being named Puryear Field in 2018.  Whitworth began playing football in 1904, and has only missed 7 seasons since then, due to World War I (1917–1919) and World War II (1942–1945).

Whitworth has won a total of 13 Northwest Conference McIlroy-Lewis All-Sports Trophies, including the last 12 in a row (2008–2019).
Whitworth men's swimming won the Northwest Conference Swimming Championship in 2022.

Student life
The Associated Students of Whitworth University ("ASWU") is in charge of clubs and activities on campus. The ASWU is composed of four executive officers (President, Vice President, Finance Director and Communications Director) who coordinate the student government and lead the student body, several residence hall senators and representatives who represent specific living areas and hold voting power, and coordinators who are responsible for programming in specialized areas.

Campus media 
Whitworth.fm is the campus' online radio station, owned and operated by ASWU. The station includes music, talk shows and coverage of Whitworth sporting events.

The Whitworthian is the weekly student newspaper. The paper has received a number of awards, including "Best All-Around Non-Daily Student Newspaper" from the National Mark of Excellence Awards sponsored by the Society of Professional Journalists in 2009.

Canopy is Whitworth's yearbook that has been in publication since 1914. The yearbook has won numerous awards including "Best in Show" awards from the Associated Collegiate Press, and "Most Outstanding University Yearbook for 2017" and first-place award among universities with a student population of 1,701-2,500 from the American Scholastic Press Association.

Notable alumni

 Sam Adams, former CFL player for the BC Lions
 Michael Allan (2007), professional football player
 Blaine Bennett, college football head coach at Western Oregon University and Central Washington University
 Richard Carr, Chief of Chaplains of the U.S. Air Force
 Richard Cizik (1973), vice president for governmental affairs for the National Association of Evangelicals, was named one of Time magazine's 100 Most Influential People of 2008
 Zilfa Estcourt (1904), features writer and women's editor at the Tacoma Ledger, the Tacoma Tribune, and the San Francisco Chronicle
 Leo Ezerins, former CFL player for the Winnipeg Blue Bombers and Hamilton Tiger-Cats
 Brian Fennell, musician who co-founded indie band Barcelona and performs under the name "SYML"
 Sia Figiel, Samoan novelist
 Dave Holmes, college football head coach at Eastern Washington University and University of Hawaiʻi at Mānoa
 Dan Inosanto (1958), Filipino-American martial arts instructor best known as a training partner of Bruce Lee
 Sara Jackson-Holman, singer-songwriter
 Edward Kienholz, American Pop Art installation artist
 Michael K. Le Roy (1989), Former President of Calvin University
 Doug Long, former NFL player for the Seattle Seahawks
 David G. Maloney (1977), physician, scientist and cancer researcher 
 Stephen C. Meyer (1981), executive officer and co-founder of the Discovery Institute and former philosophy professor at Whitworth
 Alfred Mutua (1996), cabinet secretary of foreign and diaspora affairs, Kenya; former governor of Machakos County
 David Myers (1964), social psychologist and author
 Jenna Lee Nardella (2004), author and co-founder of Blood: Water Mission
 Kevin C. Parker (1996) owner of Dutch Bros Spokane, adjunct professor at Whitworth University and Gonzaga University. Member of the Washington House of Representatives from 2008 to 2016.
 Ralph Polson (1952), professional basketball player
 Mike Riley (1977, Master's Degree), former University of Nebraska football coach
 Trevor St. John, American actor on One Life to Live
 Ray Stone (1951), former mayor of Coeur d'Alene, Idaho, bachelor's completed in 1951; master's degree from Whitworth in 1952.
 Ken Sugarman, former CFL player for the BC Lions
 Bob Ward (1955), strength and conditioning coach in the NFL for the Dallas Cowboys. Fullerton College head track coach
 Paul Ward, former NFL player for the Detroit Lions. University of Kentucky head track coach
 Austin Washington, professional soccer player. He transferred to Gonzaga University in 2005
 Ray Washburn (1961), professional baseball player
 Patrice Wilson, record producer

References

External links
 
 Whitworth Pirates athletics

 
Universities and colleges accredited by the Northwest Commission on Colleges and Universities
Universities and colleges affiliated with the Presbyterian Church (USA)
Educational institutions established in 1890
Council for Christian Colleges and Universities
1890 establishments in Washington (state)
Private universities and colleges in Washington (state)